Garamig ud Nodardashiragan was a late Sasanian province in present-day northern Iraq. The province was a combination of two provinces, Garamig and Nodardashiragan. The province is first mentioned in the Nestorian hyparchies in 410.  The main cities of the province were Kirkuk and Irbil, which served as the seats of Nestorian metropolitans. The province was conquered in 637 during the Arab conquest of Iran.

Sources 
 
 

Provinces of the Sasanian Empire
Ancient Upper Mesopotamia